Amata monticola  is a species of moth of the family Erebidae first described by Per Olof Christopher Aurivillius in 1910. It is found in Tanzania.

Related pages
List of moths of Tanzania

References 

Endemic fauna of Tanzania
monticola
Insects of Tanzania
Moths of Africa
Moths described in 1910